Faqih-e Hasanan (also Romanized as Faqīh-e Ḩasanān and Faqīh Ḩasanān; also known as Fadī Hasān, Faghih Hasnān, and Faoih Hasanān) is a village in Khvormuj Rural District, in the Central District of Dashti County, Bushehr Province, Iran. At the 2006 census, its population was 147, in 30 families.

References 

Populated places in Dashti County